The KBO–NPB Club Championship 2010 was contested between the champions of Nippon Professional Baseball's Japan Series, and the Korea Baseball Organization's Korean Series on Saturday, 13 November 2010. The game was played at the Tokyo Dome. The 2010 Championship was won by Japan's Chiba Lotte Marines.

Game summary

References

2010
2010 in baseball
2010
KBO-NPB Club Championship
KBO-NPB Club Championship
Sports competitions in Tokyo
KBO-NPB Club Championship
KBO-NPB Club Championship

ja:日韓クラブチャンピオンシップ#2010年